Bungeworgorai is a rural locality in the Maranoa Region, Queensland, Australia.

Geography 
The Western railway line and Warrego Highway pass along the southern boundary of the locality.

Kingull is a neighbourhood in the locality.

Nareeten is a neighbourhood in the locality.

History 
The name Nareeten comes from a former railway station name, assigned by the Queensland Railways Department on 11 November 1915, and is an Aboriginal word meaning wild flower. The name was proposed by the Orallo Farmers and Settlers Association.

Bungeworgorai State School opened circa 1885 and closed circa 1897.

Education 
There are no schools in the locality. The nearest primary and secondary school is Roma State College in Roma to the south-east.

References

Maranoa Region
Localities in Queensland